Bloomfield College is a private college in Bloomfield, New Jersey. It is chartered by the State of New Jersey and accredited by the Middle States Commission on Higher Education. The college is affiliated with the Presbyterian Church (USA) through the Synod of the Northeast.

History
Bloomfield College was founded by the Presbyterian Church in 1868 as German Theological Seminary of Newark, New Jersey, to train German-speaking ministers. It moved to Bloomfield in 1872 and became four-year college in 1923. In 1912 it absorbed the Presbyterian Hospital School of Nursing, founded in 1912 in nearby Newark.

The school's enrollment peaked in 2011. In October 2021, the school announced that it could close in 2022-2023 if it did not find financial help.

In March 2022, Montclair State University announced that it would financially support the college until a merger was agreed upon. The merger was officially announced on October 28, 2022 that the college would become Bloomfield College of Montclair State University.

Academics
The college offers primarily undergraduate studies, but it has added master's programs in Accounting, Fine Arts, and Education. The college is accredited by Middle States Association of Colleges and Schools. Bloomfield College has a student to faculty ratio of 15:1.

Bloomfield College has approximately 1,598 students and about 65% of the students are commuters. Its gender composition is 63 percent female and 37 percent male. Its racial and ethnic composition is 48 percent black, 33 percent Hispanic, 9 percent white, and 2 percent Asian. Seventy-eight percent of the students were eligible for low-income Pell Grants. The academic staff consists of 60 full-time instructors and 120 part-time.

Bloomfield College has a graduation rate of 33 percent. Median salary after attending ranged from $18,548 (BA, Visual and Performing Arts) to $77,966 (BS, Nursing). Median student debt ranged from $26,000 to $33,912. Two years after student loan repayment began, 11 percent were making progress.

In its 2022 college rankings, U.S. News & World Report ranked Bloomfield College tied for 27th place for social mobility.

Athletics
Bloomfield College teams participate as a member of the National Collegiate Athletic Association's Division II. The Bears are a member of the Central Atlantic Collegiate Conference (CACC). Men's sports include baseball, basketball, cross country, soccer, tennis, and track and field; while women's sports include basketball, bowling, cross country, soccer, softball, track and field, and volleyball.

Westminster Arts Center
Bloomfield College is home to the Westminster Arts Center.

Notable alumni

 C. Louis Bassano (born 1942), politician who served in both the New Jersey General Assembly and the New Jersey Senate.
 Ralph R. Caputo (born 1940), politician who represents the 28th Legislative District in the New Jersey General Assembly.
 Rupert Crosse (1927-1973), Academy Award-nominated actor.
 Sandra Bolden Cunningham (born 1950), politician who represents the 31st Legislative District in the New Jersey Senate.
 Gage Daye (born 1989), former NBA G League basketball player.
 Nacho Díez (born 1996), basketball player for Real Madrid Baloncesto.
 Ted Koffman (born 1944; B.A. 1968), politician who served in the Maine House of Representatives from 2000 to 2008.
 David Stergakos (born 1956), retired Greek basketball player who played professionally for Panathinaikos B.C.

References

External links 

 
Official athletics website

 
Bloomfield, New Jersey
Educational institutions established in 1868
Universities and colleges in Essex County, New Jersey
1868 establishments in New Jersey
Universities and colleges affiliated with the Presbyterian Church (USA)
Private universities and colleges in New Jersey